Leucosyrinx xenica is an extinct species of sea snail, a marine gastropod mollusk in the family Pseudomelatomidae, the turrids and allies.

Description
The length of the shell attains 15.4 mm, its diameter 4.9 mm.

Distribution
Fossils of this marine species were found in Miocene strata of the Upper Gatun Formation of Panama; age range:  11.608 to 7.246 Ma

References

 W. P. Woodring. 1970. Geology and paleontology of canal zone and adjoining parts of Panama: Description of Tertiary mollusks (gastropods: Eulimidae, Marginellidae to Helminthoglyptidae). United States Geological Survey Professional Paper 306(D):299–452

xenica
Gastropods described in 1970